The Brothers: Isley is the seventh album released by The Isley Brothers on their own T-Neck label on October 18, 1969.  After years with other labels and fresh off the success of the It's Our Thing (1969) album, which included the hit title track, "It's Your Thing", the Isley Brothers celebrated their newfound independence by releasing another new album that year with this LP. The album yielded the Billboard Top 40 pop hit, "I Turned You On" and subsequent charters, "Was It Good to You?" and "Black Berries". It was also their second full venture into funk music, a genre they would dominate in the coming years. The album was remastered and expanded for inclusion in the 2015 released CD box set The RCA Victor & T-Neck Album Masters (1959-1983).

Track listing

Personnel
The Isley Brothers
Ronald Isley – lead vocals
O'Kelly Isley, Jr. – backing vocals; co-lead vocals on "Black Berries"
Rudolph Isley – backing vocals; lead vocals on "I Got to Get Myself Together"
Ernie Isley – guitars, drums
Chris Jasper, Everett Collins – piano, keyboards
Marvin Isley – bass

with
Other instrumentation by assorted New York City musicians

Technical
Tony May – engineer

References

External links 
 The Isley Brothers - The Brothers: Isley (1969) album review by Andrew Hamilton, credits & releases at AllMusic
 The Isley Brothers - The Brothers: Isley (1969) album releases & credits at Discogs
 The Isley Brothers - The Brothers: Isley (1969) album to be listened as stream on Spotify

1969 albums
The Isley Brothers albums
T-Neck Records albums
Buddah Records albums